Pterostylis crassa, commonly known as the coarse leafy greenhood,  is a plant in the orchid family Orchidaceae and is endemic to Victoria. As with similar greenhoods, plants in flower differ from those that are not. Those not in flower have a rosette of leaves on a short stalk but when flowering, plants have up to four relatively large, shiny dark green translucent flowers on a flowering stem with stem leaves.

Description
Pterostylis crassa, is a terrestrial,  perennial, deciduous, herb with an underground tuber. The dorsal sepal and petals are joined to form a hood called the "galea" over the column. The galea is transparent green with darker green lines and a brown or green, tapered tip. Flowering occurs from September to October.

Taxonomy and naming
The coarse leafy greenhood was first formally described in 2006 by David Jones and given the name Bunochilus crassus. The description was published in Australian Orchid Research. In 2007, Gary Backhouse changed the name to Pterostylis crassa. The specific epithet (crassa) is a Latin word meaning "thick", "fat" or "stout", referring to the thick, fleshy flowers of this species.

Distribution and habitat
Pterostylis crassa occurs in dry woodland and forest in the far north-east corner of Victoria.

References

crassa
Endemic orchids of Australia
Orchids of Victoria (Australia)
Plants described in 2006